Bodhin Kjolhede (born 1948) is a Sōtō/Rinzai Zen roshi and Abbot of the Rochester Zen Center (RZC), a position he assumed when Philip Kapleau retired from teaching in 1986. He was ordained as a priest in 1976 and received Dharma transmission in 1986. He has authorized eight of his disciples as teachers in their own right: Sante Poromaa, Kanja Odland, Sevan Ross, Gerardo Gally, Amala Wrightson, Robert Goldmann, John Pulleyn, and Donna Kowal. Additionally, Kjolhede has been offered transmission in a Sōtō lineage, but has thus far chosen to decline.

See also
Buddhism in the United States
Haku'un Yasutani
Timeline of Zen Buddhism in the United States

Galleries

Chapin Mill

RZC

Notes

References

1948 births
Living people
Zen Buddhist priests
Sanbo Kyodan Buddhists
American Zen Buddhists